The 1914 Saskatchewan Huskies football team represented the University of Saskatchewan in Canadian football. This was their second season and their first as a team that represented all colleges on campus.

Schedule

Roster

References

Saskatchewan Huskies football seasons
1914 in Canadian football